Paramount Crossroads, also known as 15 Khordad Crossroads, is a major intersection in a heavily traveled and central area in Shiraz, Iran. It is the junction of Enqelab-e Eslami Street, Lotfali Khan Street and Qasrodasht Street. There is a fuel station docked on the intersection and Zaytoon Shopping Center is in the immediate area. The junction is often used as an assembly point for protests.

History
The intersection derives its two names from the Paramount Cinema (Persian: , named after the American company Paramount Pictures) and 15 Khordad.

Infrastructure
As of November 2011, the intersection has outdoor loudspeakers that are part of a system used for audio broadcasts across the city.

Demonstrations
As per the International Quran News Agency, in 2009, demonstrators rallied in support of the Palestinian people at the intersection. As per the International Quran News Agency, Ministry of Economic Affairs and Finance, Jamejam and the Iranian Students News Agency; in 2010 and 2011, it was selected as the venue for a march held in commemoration of the Iranian Revolution's 30th and 31st anniversaries, respectively. As per Khabar Farsi, Islamic Republic of Iran Broadcasting, the Islamic Republic News Agency, and the Shiraz News Agency; in 2011, it was the site of Quds Day rallies.

Transportation

Streets
 Enqelab-e Eslami Street
 Lotfali Khan Street
 Qasroddasht Street

Buses
 Route 4
 Route 18
 Route 90
 Route 91
 Route 155

References

Streets in Iran